The 1970 Open Championship was the 99th Open Championship, played 8–12 July at the Old Course in St Andrews, Scotland. Jack Nicklaus won the second of his three Opens in an 18-hole Sunday playoff over Doug Sanders, 72 to 73. In gusty winds during the fourth round on Saturday, Sanders saved par from the Road Hole bunker and led by one heading to the 72nd hole. After a lengthy drive on the short par-4, he took four shots from just  and missed a downhill putt for par from three feet to win.

This was the first playoff at The Open since 1963 and the first at 18 holes. The previous playoffs were 36 holes on Saturday. Prior to 1966, the final two rounds of The Open were played on Friday. The playoff format was changed again to the four-hole aggregate after the 1985 Open, first used in 1989.

A thunderstorm late in the opening round on Wednesday evening caused a suspension in play; it was competed early the next day.

Course

^ The 10th hole was posthumously named for Bobby Jones in 1972

Previous lengths of the course for The Open Championship (since 1950):
  - 1964
  - 1960, 1955

Past champions in the field

Made both cuts

Missed the second cut

Missed the first cut

Round summaries

First round
Wednesday, 8 July 1970
Thursday, 9 July 1970

Source:

Second round
Thursday, 9 July 1970

Source:
Amateurs: Melnyk (-1), Bonallack (+1), Humphreys (+2), George (+2), Webster (+5),MacDonald (+7), Berry (+8), Steel (+10), Mosey (+11), Sumner (+11), Sweeny Jr (+11), Farmer (+14)

Third round
Friday, 10 July 1970

Source:
Amateurs: Melnyk (+3), Humphreys (+6), Bonallack (+8), George (+9), Webster (+11)

Final round
Saturday, 11 July 1970

Source:
Amateurs: Melnyk (+10), Humphreys (+13)

Playoff
Sunday, 12 July 1970

Source:

Scorecard

{|class="wikitable" span = 50 style="font-size:85%;
|-
|style="background: Pink;" width=10|
|Birdie
|style="background: PaleGreen;" width=10|
|Bogey
|}

References

External links
St Andrews 1970 (Official site)

The Open Championship
Golf tournaments in Scotland
Open Championship
Open Championship
Open Championship